Spekia zonata is a species of freshwater snail, an aquatic gastropod mollusk in the family Paludomidae. This species is found in Burundi and the Democratic Republic of the Congo. Its natural habitat is freshwater lakes.

References

Paludomidae
Gastropods described in 1859
Taxonomy articles created by Polbot
Snails of Lake Tanganyika